The 1994 Atlantic 10 men's basketball tournament was played from March 5 to March 7, 1994, and March 11, 1994. The first three rounds were played at the Palestra in Philadelphia, Pennsylvania, while the final was played at the Mullins Center in Amherst, Massachusetts.  The winner was named champion of the Atlantic 10 Conference and received an automatic bid to the 1994 NCAA Men's Division I Basketball Tournament. The University of Massachusetts won the tournament for the third year in a row. George Washington and Temple also received bids to the NCAA Tournament. Mike Williams of Massachusetts was named the tournament's Most Outstanding Player. Future NBA players Derrick Alston (Duquesne), Eddie Jones (Temple), Aaron McKie (Temple), and Lou Roe (Massachusetts) joined Williams on the All-Championship Team.

Bracket

* - Overtime

Atlantic 10 men's basketball tournament
Tournament
Atlantic 10 men's basketball tournament
Atlantic 10 men's basketball tournament
Atlantic 10 men's basketball tournament